This was the first edition of the tournament.

Zhu Lin won the title, defeating Wang Yafan in the final, 6–4, 6–1.

Seeds

Draw

Finals

Top half

Bottom half

References
Main Draw

Jinan International Open - Singles